Andreas Scherhaufer (born 24 July 1970 in Vienna) is an Austrian trap shooter. He competed in the trap event at the 2012 Summer Olympics and placed 17th in the qualification round.

References

1970 births
Living people
Austrian male sport shooters
Olympic shooters of Austria
Shooters at the 2012 Summer Olympics
Sportspeople from Vienna
European Games competitors for Austria
Shooters at the 2015 European Games
21st-century Austrian people